Eleanor Neville (c. 1398–1472) was the second daughter of Ralph de Neville, 1st Earl of Westmorland (died 1425), by his second wife, Joan Beaufort, daughter of John of Gaunt, 1st Duke of Lancaster, and Katherine Swynford.

Marriage and children
She was married first to Richard le Despenser, 4th Baron Burghersh, a grandson of Gaunt's younger brother Edmund of Langley, 1st Duke of York. After his early death without issue, she married Henry Percy, 2nd Earl of Northumberland (killed at the First Battle of St Albans, 1455).

Eleanor and Henry had ten children: 
 John Percy (b. 8 July 1418)
 Henry Percy, 3rd Earl of Northumberland (25 July 1421 – 29 March 1461, Battle of Towton)
 Thomas Percy, 1st Baron Egremont (29 November 1422, Leconfield, Yorkshire – 10 July 1460, Battle of Northampton, England)
 Lady Katherine Percy (28 May 1423 – d. aft 1475). She married Edmund Grey, 1st Earl of Kent
 George Percy (24 July 1424 – 14 November 1474)
 Sir Ralph Percy (1425 – 25 April 1464, Battle of Hedgeley Moor)
 Sir Richard Percy (1426/7–29 March 1461, Battle of Towton)
 William Percy, Bishop of Carlisle (7 April 1428 – 26 April 1462)
 Joan Percy
 Anne Percy. She was the second wife of William Fitzalan, 11th Earl of Arundel

Ancestry

External links
 Inquisition Post Mortem #632, assignment of Dower, dated 1415.

References

1390s births
1472 deaths
Daughters of British earls
English countesses
Burghersh
Eleanor
14th-century English people
14th-century English women
15th-century English people
15th-century English women